Kentucky Route 165 (KY 165) is a  state highway in Kentucky. It runs from KY 32 and Pike Bluff Road southeast of Ewing to KY 19 southwest of Brooksville via Ewing and Mount Olivet.

Major intersections

References

0165
Kentucky Route 165
Kentucky Route 165
Kentucky Route 165